Racing Club de Bobo Dioulasso also known as RC Bobo Dioulasso is a Burkinabé football club based in Bobo-Dioulasso. They play their home games at the Stade Municipal.

The club colours are black and white. The club was founded in 1949.

Current squad

Achievements
Burkinabé Premier League: 4
 1972, 1996, 1997, 2014–15

Coupe du Faso: 7
 1961, 1962, 1984, 1987, 1995, 2007, 2014.

Burkinabé Leaders Cup: 3
 1993, 1997, 1998.

Burkinabé SuperCup: 2
 1994/95, 2014.

Performance in CAF competitions
CAF Champions League: 2 appearances
1997 – Preliminary Round
1998 – First Round

CAF Confederation Cup: 1 appearance
2015 – Preliminary Round

CAF Cup Winners' Cup: 2 appearances
1984 – First Round
1985 – withdrew in Preliminary Round

CAF Cup: 1 appearance
1994 – First Round

External links
Team profile – footballdatabase.eu

Football clubs in Burkina Faso
Association football clubs established in 1949
Bobo-Dioulasso
1949 establishments in French Upper Volta